The term United States domestic market (USDM) is an unofficial term used chiefly by automotive enthusiasts to describe the United States' economic market for American-brand automobiles and parts. Similar automotive enthusiast terms Japanese domestic market (JDM) and European domestic market (EDM) are used to designate Japanese- and European-market automobiles and parts respectively.

The term is also applied to vehicles that comply with United States regulations, most notably the lights and bumpers, which differ from European standards. The incompatibility requires manufacturers to develop USD and EDM versions of their models if they want to sell them in both regions.

Sometimes the conversion in the factory lane is done after the model was launched in the European Market. The conversion to United States federal laws is often called "federalization".

Economy of the United States